Chokkanathapuram is a village in the Pattukkottai taluk of Thanjavur district, Tamil Nadu, India.

Demographics 
As per the 2001 census, Chokkanathapuram had a total population of 2127 with 1031 males and 1096 females. The sex ratio was 1063. The literacy rate was 69.62.

References 
 

Villages in Thanjavur district